Encruphion is a genus of moths of the family Erebidae. The genus was erected by William Schaus in 1914.

Species
Encruphion leena H. Druce, 1898
Encruphion phalereus Schaus, 1914
Encruphion porrima Schaus, 1914
Encruphion sericina Hampson, 1926
Encruphion xanthotricha Hampson, 1926

References

Calpinae